Kemanak is a banana-shaped idiophone used in Javanese gamelan, made of bronze. They are actually metal slit drums. It is struck with a padded stick and then allowed to resonate. It has a specific pitch, which can be varied by covering the slit, but it is not matched to the other instruments of the gamelan. They are usually played in pairs, although they can be played in sets of four as well. They are used to accompany the bedhaya and serimpi, female court dances.

Kemanak is also a style of gendhing which includes, in addition to kemanak, only colotomic instruments, a kendang, and a sindhen.

In the region of Cirebon on the Northwest Coast of Java, Kemanak are played in pairs by striking one against the other in a repetitive fashion.  Unlike in Central Java, Kemanak in Cirebon are not reserved for specific performance idioms and are considered indispensable in the standard Gamelan repertoire.

References
Kunst, Jaap. The Origin of the Kemanak. 'S-Gravenhage, Martinus Nijhoff, 1960.

Gamelan instruments
Idiophones
Indonesian musical instruments